Rail Rozakov (born March 29, 1981) is a Russian former professional ice hockey defenceman.  He was drafted 106th overall in the 1999 NHL Entry Draft by the Calgary Flames.

Career statistics

External links

1981 births
Living people
Barys Nur-Sultan players
Calgary Flames draft picks
HC CSK VVS Samara players
HC CSKA Moscow players
HC Lada Togliatti players
Metallurg Novokuznetsk players
HC Sibir Novosibirsk players
Krylya Sovetov Moscow players
Lowell Lock Monsters players
Russian ice hockey defencemen
Severstal Cherepovets players
Traktor Chelyabinsk players
HC Vityaz players
People from Murmansk
Sportspeople from Murmansk Oblast